The Aiguille du Midi is a  mountain in the Mont Blanc massif within the French Alps. It is a popular tourist destination and can be directly accessed by cable car from Chamonix that takes visitors close to Mont Blanc.

Cable car 
The idea for a cable car to the summit, the Téléphérique de l'Aiguille du Midi, was originally proposed around 1909, but did not come into operation until 1955 when it held the title of the world's highest cable car for about two decades.

The span of the second section is  measured directly, but only  measured horizontally. Thus it remains the second longest span width, measured directly. The cable car travels from Chamonix to the top of the Aiguille du Midi – an altitude gain of over  – in 20 minutes, costing around €60 for an adult ticket from Chamonix and back. 

There is access by cable car to a nearby peak on the Italian side, called Skyway Monte Bianco, with a vertical lift of 2,166 m, and a cable car from that peak to Aiguille du Midi. This is only open in the summer.

Summit 
At the mountain's summit there is a panoramic viewing platform, a snack bar, a café, a restaurant, and a gift shop. Because of the danger, tourists are unable to leave the visitor facilities on the Midi's summit. However, mountaineers and skiers can pass through a tunnel to reach the steep and extremely exposed ice ridge to descend to the glacier below.

In December 2013, a glass skywalk called "Step into the Void" opened at the top of the Aiguille du Midi peak. The view is  straight down, and one can see Mont Blanc to the south. A further tourist attraction called "Le Tube" opened in 2016. It consists of an enclosed tubular walkway that completely circles the summit.

During summer months only, the Vallée Blanche Cable Car crosses "peak-to-peak" from Aiguille du Midi to Pointe Helbronner at the Italian side of the Mont Blanc Massif. Pointe Helbronner is served by another cable car, Skyway Monte Bianco, to Entrèves, near the Italian town of Courmayeur in the Aosta Valley. This makes it possible to travel "by air" from Chamonix, France to Courmayeur, Italy – a route normally traversed by the highway running through the Mont Blanc Tunnel.

Mountaineering 
Several routes for fit, experienced mountaineers can either start or finish at the Aiguille du Midi, although the nearby Cosmiques Refuge is the best starting point for the longer routes: 
Arête des Cosmiques (also known as the Cosmiques Ridge) is a short, mixed rock and ice route that can be reached from the Midi station and which returns there in an unusual manner, exiting from the top of a ladder onto the Midi station viewing platform. It is very popular, and therefore busy, and is often used as an alpine training climb as it requires all-around mountaineering skills. Graded at PD+ to AD, the round-trip can easily be completed from Chamonix in one day. First ascent by George and Maxwell Finched on 2 August 1911.
Midi-Plan traverse traverse from the Aiguille du Midi to the Aiguille du Plan, either returning to the cable car or descending the Mer de Glace from the 'Plan' to the Requin Hut or continuing to Montenvers.
Mont Blanc du Tacul Usually done from the Cosmiques Hut, but fit parties sometimes take the first-morning telepherique and descend from the 'Midi'. Alternatively, it can be combined with a return to the cable car station via an ascent of the Cosmiques ridge.
The Traverse of Mont Blanc, also known in French as La Voie des Trois Mont Blancs or just La Traversée, is a long route, graded at PD+ which starts from the Cosmiques Hut. This popular route is less exposed to danger than the Gouter Route, but under certain conditions, both Mont Blanc du Tacul and Mont Maudit can develop slopes with very high avalanche risk.

Gallery

See also

List of mountains of the Alps above 3000 m

References

External links 

Alpine three-thousanders
Mountains of the Alps
Vertical transport devices
Mountains of Haute-Savoie
Mont Blanc massif
Tourist attractions in Haute-Savoie